Kutuzovo-Novoye railway station is a railway station located in Kaliningrad, Kaliningrad Oblast, Russia. It is part of the Kaliningrad Railway, on the line between Kaliningrad North railway station and northern destinations including Baltiysk, Sovetsk, Guryevsk, Svetlogorsk, Pionersky, Zelenogradsk and Polessk. It was formerly known as Rothenstein, during the period when Kaliningrad was part of Germany as Königsberg, and served the Rothenstein quarter of the city.

Description
Kutuzovo-Novoye is three kilometres from Kaliningrad North railway station; and nine from Guryevsk-Tsentralny railway station, on the line to Sovetsk, and six from platform 7 km on the line to Zelenogradsk. It handles both cargo and passengers, with Elektrichka suburban commuter trains stopping on their journeys between Kaliningrad South railway station and the stations of Guryevsk-Novoye, Zelenogradsk-Novoye, Pionersky Kurort, and Sovetsk. Svetlogorsk and Slavyansky can also be reached by direct train.

Kutuzovo-Novoye has a passenger footbridge, two platforms and seven railway tracks.

References 

Railway stations in Kaliningrad Oblast